Bali Gagandeep (born 2 June 1990) is an Indian professional footballer who plays as a forward for Delhi FC.

Career
Gagandeep made his debut for Salgaocar on 18 October 2013 against Mumabi at Balewadi Sports Complex in which he started and played 51 minutes as Salgaocar won the match 3–1.

In May 2018 he joined East Bengal FC. He was red carded in his first I-League match for the red and golds against Churchill Brothers SC.

Career statistics

References

External links 
 I-League profile.

1990 births
Living people

Indian footballers
Salgaocar FC players
Association football forwards
Footballers from Punjab, India
I-League players
East Bengal Club players
RoundGlass Punjab FC players